Kartalian, Kartalyan is an Armenian surname. Notable people with the surname include:

Buck Kartalian (1922–2016), American wrestler and actor
Jason Kartalian, American film producer, director, and writer

Armenian-language surnames